Pachycormus (from  , 'thick' and   'timber log') is an extinct genus of pachycormiform ray-finned fish known from the Early Jurassic (Toarcian stage) of Europe. The type species P. macropterus was first named as a species of Elops by Henri Marie Ducrotay de Blainville in 1818, it was placed into the newly named genus Pachycormus by Louis Agassiz in 1833. Fossils have been found in marine deposits from France, Germany and England. Pachycormus has recently been considered monotypic, only containing P. macropterus, with other species considered junior synonyms of the former, though this has subsequently been questioned. Pachycormus has generally been considered basal among Pachycormiformes, with a recent phylogeny finding it to be the second most basal pachycormiform after Euthynotus. It grew up to 1 m (3.5 ft) in length. The teeth are short and designed for grasping. Its ecology has been interpreted as that of a generalist predator.

References

 Fossils (Smithsonian Handbooks) by David Ward (page 214)

Jurassic bony fish
Prehistoric ray-finned fish genera
Pachycormiformes
Jurassic fish of Europe
Taxa named by Louis Agassiz